David Del Rio is an American actor, director and producer who has appeared in films and live productions such as Pitch Perfect and Grease Live!, and has previously directed several short films. He graduated from New World School of the Arts in Miami, Florida, in 2006, and afterward graduated from the New York Conservatory for Dramatic Arts, School of Film and Television.

Filmography
Film

Television

References

External links

21st-century American male actors
American male child actors
American male film actors
American male television actors
Living people
1987 births
Male actors from Miami